This is a list of notable events in country music that took place in the year 1932.

Events 
1932 marked the lowest trough the recording industry would experience during the Great Depression, as sales tumbled to pre-1905 levels. In the United States, revenues went from 104 million units in 1927 to 6 million in 1932, and did not start to rebound until 1937.

Top Hillbilly (Country) Recordings 1932

The following songs were extracted from records included in Joel Whitburn's Pop Memories 1890-1954, record sales reported on the "Discography of American Historical Recordings" website, and other sources as specified. Numerical rankings are approximate, they are only used as a frame of reference.

Births 
 January 31 – Rick Hall, songwriter and producer (died 2018).
 February 3 – Bill Mack, country music radio personality best known for hosting Country Crossroads, and songwriter ("Blue" and "Drinking Champagne").(died 2020)
 February 25 – Faron Young, honky tonk singer whose popularity spanned the 1950s through mid-1970s (died 1996).
 February 26 – Johnny Cash, vastly influential in all genres of American popular music, most notably country (died 2003).
 April 14 – Loretta Lynn, leading country singer-songwriter of the 1960s and 1970s (died 2022).
 August 8 – Mel Tillis, singer-songwriter who overcame a speech impediment to become one of the genre's biggest stars of the 1950s through 1980s (died 2017).
 September 8 – Patsy Cline, one of the most influential singers in American popular music, first female country singer to cross over to the pop charts (died 1963).
 October 11 – Dottie West, female vocalist who successfully transferred from the Nashville Sound (of the 1960s) to more straight-ahead pop country during the late 1970s and early 1980s (died 1991).
November 6 – Paul English, drummer for Willie Nelson (died 2020).
 November 13 – Buddy Killen, record producer and music publishing owner (died 2006).

Deaths

Further reading 
 Kingsbury, Paul, "Vinyl Hayride: Country Music Album Covers 1947–1989," Country Music Foundation, 2003
 Millard, Bob, "Country Music: 70 Years of America's Favorite Music," HarperCollins, New York, 1993
 Whitburn, Joel. "Top Country Songs 1944–2005 – 6th Edition." 2005.

References

Country
Country music by year